Sister Nancy Nolan, S.P. (May 13, 1936 - December 20, 2020) was the Superior General of the Sisters of Providence of Saint Mary-of-the-Woods, Indiana, from 1986-1996. During her term, she completed renovation of the Church of the Immaculate Conception (Saint Mary-of-the-Woods, Indiana). Nolan also oversaw the 150th anniversary of the Congregation, founded by Saint Mother Theodore Guerin in 1840, and completed the construction of Providence Center at Saint Mary-of-the-Woods.

During her term she was actively involved in the process of promoting the Cause for the Canonization of Mother Theodore Guerin, who was canonized a Roman Catholic saint in 2006.

After serving as Superior General, Nolan spent time as president of Guerin College Preparatory High School in Chicago until February 2007. A scholarship program there, Nolan Scholars, was named in her honor.

On December 20, 2020, at the age of 84, Nolan died at the motherhouse in Saint Mary-of-the-Woods, Indiana.

References
 

 

 

American school administrators
20th-century American Roman Catholic nuns
Sisters of Providence of Saint Mary-of-the-Woods
21st-century American Roman Catholic nuns
1936 births
2020 deaths